Dyce is a suburb of Aberdeen, Scotland, situated on the River Don about  northwest of the city centre. It is best known as the location of Aberdeen Airport.

History 

Dyce is the site of an early medieval church dedicated to the 8th century missionary and bishop Saint Fergus, otherwise associated with Glamis, Angus. Today the cemetery, north of the airport, and overlooking the River Don, hosts the roofless but otherwise virtually complete former St Fergus Chapel, within which Pictish and early Christian stones from the 7th–9th centuries, found in or around the churchyard, are displayed (Historic Scotland; open at all times without entrance charge).

The Chapel is a unicameral late medieval building with alterations perhaps of the 17th or 18th century. Two further carved stones, of uncertain (though probably early) character, were discovered re-used as building rubble in the inner east gable and outer south wall during the chapel's restoration. They were left in situ and are readily visible. A broken font, somewhat resembling a round-backed chair in its present condition, lies outside the church, and may also be of early medieval date.

The graveyard surrounding the old church was used into the 20th century, and retains almost no old gravestones. There is a small morthouse in one corner of the enclosure, which is adjoined by a modern extension, still in use for burials. During World War I conscientious objectors laboured at Dyce Work Camp at Dyce Quarries. One of these is believed to be the Tyrebagger Quarry just north of Aberdeen to the East of the A96.

A major employer in the village was the firm Lawsons which was a meat producer, mainly of pork and ham. In the 1920s a small local farmers cooperative, which had been mothballed, was taken over by the Lawson family, originally from Dunfermline. The site was developed till eventually employing around 1,800 people at its peak. They supplied product throughout Scotland and had a major contract to supply Marks & Spencer under licence.

Climate

Economy 

Dyce has one main shopping centre which includes an Asda store, with a Boots chemist, a hairdresser, an optometrist and several empty units.

Oil
Aker Solutions, the Norway-based oilfield services giant, runs its UK operations from Dyce, at the Aberdeen International Business Park. The North Sea headquarters of BP are located at the Farburn Industrial Estate.

Charles III, then Prince Charles, visited Dyce on 3 September 1992 to BP to officially inaugurate the Miller oilfield; he later met people with the Prince's Scottish Youth Business Trust (now called Youth Business Scotland).

Transport
Aberdeen Airport is located in Dyce.

Dyce railway station is served by ScotRail trains on the Aberdeen to Inverness Line.

The Formartine and Buchan Way, a pedestrian and cycle path, starts at Dyce railway station and continues to Newmachar, Ellon, and onward to Peterhead and Fraserburgh. It follows the trackbed of the former Formartine and Buchan Railway.

The Aberdeen Western Peripheral Route, circles west and north of the suburb. The Dyce junction was scheduled for completion in Autumn 2016.

Education
The local secondary school, Dyce Academy, has about 500 pupils. Dyce Academy is home to the Aberdeen City Music School. There is also a primary school, Dyce Primary School. Dyce is also the location for the Cordyce School, a secondary school serving pupils who require additional support. In November 2017, Cordyce School suffered extensive damage following a fire that engulfed most of the building. following the fire, four young boys, three aged fifteen and one aged fourteen, were charged.

Parks and recreation

The area of Aberdeen has sports facilities including the local junior football team Dyce F.C who currently play in the Scottish Junior Football Association North Region and the cricket team. Dyce also have an amateur football team, currently named Dyce ITC Hydraulics in honour of its sponsors ITC Hydarulics also of Dyce. Dyce ITC currently play in the Aberdeenshire Amateur Association Premier League and play their home games at Pitmedden Road in Dyce.

Dyce (Aberdeen) Amateur Swimming Club (Est 1977), which runs its own Swim School for those wishing to learn to swim, is based at the Dyce Academy swimming pool. The Club and Swim School are both affiliated to the Scottish Amateur Swimming Association to help swimmers compete up to North District and Scottish National Level.

People from Dyce

Dr James Edward Crombie FRSE (1862-1932) philanthropist and seismologist, of the Crombie clothing empire, lived at Parkhill House just outside Dyce.
Rev William Robinson Pirie (1804-1885) minister of Dyce 1830 to 1846, Principal of Aberdeen University and Moderator of the General Assembly of the Church of Scotland in 1864.
Alexander Chalmers (1645-1703), former mayor of Warsaw

References

Areas of Aberdeen